Stephen Michael Manley (born February 13, 1965) is an American film and television actor whose acting career began as a young boy. In 1984, he appeared as a young Spock at age 17 in the science fiction film Star Trek III: The Search for Spock.

Biography 
Stephen Manley was born in Encino, California. He was adopted when he was a few months old by Stella and Sam Manley in San Marino, California. He soon became the third generation actor of his family. His grandfather, Stephen Soldi, appeared in television between 1917 and 1966, best known as his stint as "Wimpy", Popeye's sidekick. He was in Singing in the Rain in the last shot as the man who is given the umbrella by Gene Kelly, and in A Night at the Opera with the Marx Brothers when they crowd into a hotel room. His daughter Stella soon followed in his steps making films in the 1940s and 1950s with an MGM contract. She was in Viva Zapata starring Anthony Quinn. She also stunt doubled Maria Montez at 20th Century Fox.

Career 
Manley's first television appearance was on The Art Linkletter Show at eight months old. He then started landing film, television, voice-over, and commercial work of his own at the age of six. Between the ages of seven and nine, he landed 27 parts in film and television. He is most recognized today from his part as Young Spock at 17 in Star Trek III: The Search for Spock. His Pon Farr scene with Saavik at first raised some eyebrows before the studio released the film, almost cut for being too racy for a Star Trek film. However, the scene remained in the film due to Leonard Nimoy. After wrapping the film, Stephen headed off to College and attended the Pasadena Art Center and graduated with a Bachelors in Film and Fine Art. He directed a short film called "Greasepaint" which won honors at the Houston Film Festival and aired on Bravo for two years. He then began work on a project about the French Foreign Legion called "Legion of Strangers". Stephen continues to act in film, television, and voice overs.

Selected filmography 
 Kwai Chang Caine (Boy Caine) in the television series Kung Fu
 Mark Adam-12 Episode “Pot Shot” 1/14/1975
 Bobby Todd in The Streets of San Francisco episode "River of Fear"
 Spock (age 17) in Star Trek III: The Search for Spock
 Cicero in Death in the Desert
 Willy Wintergreen in Nightwing: The Series
 Father in Black Mask
 Danny in All In The Family episode "Mike's Mysterious Son, Danny Sanders"
 Kevin in The Love Boat     episode "The Brotherhood of the Sea/Letter to Babycakes/Daddy's Pride"
 Marco Gambini in Little House On The Prairie Episode "Gambini, the Great

Awards 

 Best Actor for Black Mask and The Gradations of Purgatory at the 2014 PollyGrind Film Festival

References

External links 
 
 

1965 births
American male child actors
American male film actors
American male television actors
Living people
Male actors from Los Angeles
People from Encino, Los Angeles